Bhubaneswar 1 is an upcoming shopping mall located in Bhubaneswar, Odisha, India. Located at Mouza-Gadakana, it is going to be one of the largest malls in Bhubaneswar. The mall will be having a total floor space of  spread over five floors designed by the Unitech Group. It contains more than 200 outlets, offices, including food courts, restaurants, family entertainment zones, a multiplex and a multi level parking. The mall is yet to be inaugurated and all constructions are currently stalled due to a pending lawsuit in the Orissa High Court.

References

Shopping malls in Bhubaneswar
Shopping malls established in 2018
2018 establishments in Odisha